Teatr Biuro Podróży (Travel Agency Theatre) is an alternative theatre company based in Poznań, Poland. Founded by Paweł Szkotak in 1988, this Polish theatre ensemble creates and performs large-scale, outdoor theatre on social and political themes, using gesture, physical action, visual spectacle, music, and minimal text. The company tours regularly and has performed in fifty countries around the world.

Projects:

Theatre without Boundaries – a theatre project whose aim is to present the work of Teatr Biuro Podróży in areas of heightened
political and social tension. 
2008: work with Palestinian refugees in Bourj el Barajneh camp in southern Beirut and the presentation of “Carmen
Funebre.”
2008: research journey to Cuba and the presentation of “Pigs.”
2009: tour in the West Bank: Bethlehem, Ramallah, Jenin with the performance of “Carmen Funebre.” Meetings and barters with
local communities.

“Maski” Theater Festival, annually from 1997. Because of its social-political profile it promotes the “engaged theatre” and the performances that diagnose the condition of the contemporary human being in relation to the reality and facts.
International Theatre Project “Facing the Zone” dedicated to the Chernobyl disaster, created in collaboration with the Belarusian and Ukrainian partners. A journey across the contaminated zone in Belarus and Ukraine. Meetings with people who still live in the radioactive areas. A visit in Chernobyl nuclear plant and deserted city of Pripyat. Premiered in November/December 2006. Supported by the European Cultural Foundation.
theatre workshops and master classes are an inseparable part of the company's activity. They are run by the actors of Teatr Biuro Podróży. This strictly theatrical education project consists is mainly in demonstration and teaching of different acting techniques. Teatr Biuro Podróży's workshops were organized in the USA, the UK, Ireland, Iran, Germany, Russia, Belarus, Ukraine, Poland, Lebanon.

The group’s most famous piece, Carmen Funebre (Funeral Song), is based on interviews with victims of the Balkan wars. Developed in 1993-1994, Carmen Funebre continues to tour internationally, including performances in the U.S. in 2003 and in the UK in 2007. Carmen Funebre was awarded Fringe First (1995), the Critic’s Award (1995), and the Hamada Award (1996) at the Edinburgh Fringe Festival. The ensemble's most recent production, HofD (Heart of Darkness) premiered in London in the summer of 2007 at the National Theatre's outdoor festival, Watch This Space.

They have a strong relationship with the National Theatre in London, performing there every summer as part of the National's summer festival 2004-2010. Their 2010 appearance is 'Carmen Funebre' in July.

Productions 
 HofD (Heart of Darkness), 2007
 Facing the Zone, in collaboration with EcodomArt (Belarus) and Arabeski Teatr (Ukraine), 2006
 MacBeth: Who is that Bloodied Man?, 2005
 Pigs, 2003
 Eclypse, 2003
 Manuscript by Alfonso van Worden, 2001
 Millennium Mysteries, 2000
 Moonsailors, 1999
 Drink Vinegar Gentlemen, 1998
 Not of Us, 1997
 Carmen Funebre, 1993-1994
 Giordano, 1992
 The Gentle End of Death, 1990
 Einmal ist keinmal, 1989

Paweł Szkotak, founder 
Born in 1965, Szkotak was educated at Adam Mickiewicz University (Poznan, Poland). In addition to leading Teatr Biuro Podróży, he is also the artistic director of Polski Teatr in Poznan, which was named one of the best repertory theatres in Poland by Teatr magazine in 2004. He is also director of the Maski Festival of experimental theatre in Poznan. He has been granted over a dozen awards for his work, including the prestigious Passport award from Polityka magazine (2004), presented to outstanding Polish artists that represent Poland abroad.

References 
 Teatr Biuro Podróży 
 Adam Mickiewicz Institute
 Teatr Polski in Poznan

Theatre companies in Poland
Alternative theatre